The Men's  freestyle relay event at the 2010 South American Games was held on March 29 at 18:35.

Medalists

Records

Results

Final

References
Final

Medley Relay 4x100m M